Isopogon prostratus, commonly known as prostrate cone-bush, is a species of plant in the family Proteaceae and is endemic to south-eastern Australia. It is a prostrate shrub with divided leaves with linear lobes, and more or less spherical heads of yellow flowers on the ends of branchlets.

Description
The flowers are arranged on the ends of branchlets in sessile, more or less spherical heads  in diameter, with egg-shaped involucral bracts at the base.

Taxonomy
Isopogon prostratus was first formally described in 1975 by Donald McGillivray in the journal "Telopea" from specimens collected in 1860 by Ferdinand von Mueller near Twofold Bay.

Distribution and habitat
This isopogon usually grows in heath of forest, often on exposed sites, on the tablelands between the Newnes Plateau and the Tuross River in New South Wales. It is only known from two disjunct areas in Victoria, near Providence Ponds and on the Howe Range.

References

prostratus
Flora of New South Wales
Flora of Victoria (Australia)
Plants described in 1975
Taxa named by Donald McGillivray